Major General Kaizad Maneck Sopariwala was a Pakistani Army officer. He was the first Pakistani Parsi who became a Major General in the Pakistan Army.

Military career & later life
He graduated in 1986 from the United States Army Command and General Staff College.

In 2002, he received the Hilal-e-Imtiaz award.

In literature
In Agha H Amins' book, Pakistan Army Infantry Battalion Performance in the 1948 Kashmir War - A summary, Agha uses Sopariwala as a source for the number of casualties the Baloch regiment suffered during the war.

He states that Sopariwala (metaphorically) "entered the arena like an angel and was crucial in helping me gather the final part of the puzzle i.e Baluch Regiment casualties in this war."

References

Parsi people
Pakistani Zoroastrians
United States Army Command and General Staff College alumni
Pakistani generals
Recipients of Hilal-i-Imtiaz
Year of birth missing
Year of death missing